The Archangel Michael Trypiotis Church is a Greek Orthodox church in the old town of Nicosia, Cyprus.

Although incorporating earlier material, according to the inscription beside the south porch the church is dated to 1695  and it was built at the expense of the Priest Iakovos and Christian parishioners.

Important features of the church are the beautiful 18th century iconostasis that was carved by Taliadoros and the icon of Archangel Michael, which dates to 1634.

The Trypiotis Quarter of Nicosia is named after the church.

The word Trypiotis means ‘maker of the hole’.

References

Churches in Nicosia
Eastern Orthodox church buildings in Cyprus
Byzantine church buildings in Cyprus